Harvey "Harv" Burnett (born 18 August 1995) is a Scotland international professional rugby league and rugby union footballer who plays as a  or  for the Dewsbury Rams in the Betfred Championship. He is a Scotland international.

Background
Burnett was born in Kingston-upon-Thames, Surrey, England.

Career
Burnett started as a junior for the Elmbridge Eagles, and was in the London Broncos Academy system.

He made his Scotland début in 2014 against France.

In 2015 he made his Challenge Cup début for the Broncos against the Leigh Centurions.

Burnett spent time on loan at the London Skolars in 2015.

Midway through the 2015 season Burnett switched codes to play rugby union.

In 2016 Burnett returned to rugby league and joined Oxford in RFL League 1.

in 2018 Burnett joined Bradford Bulls on a one-year contract.

References

External links
Scoresway profile

1995 births
Living people
English people of Scottish descent
English rugby league players
English rugby union players
Esher RFC players
London Broncos players
London Skolars players
Oxford Rugby League players
Rugby league centres
Rugby league players from Surrey
Rugby league second-rows
Rugby league wingers
Rugby union players from Kingston upon Thames
Scotland national rugby league team players